Sabluiyeh (also Romanized as Sablū’īyeh, S̄ablū’īyeh, and S̄eblū’īyeh) is a village in Khorramdasht Rural District, in the Central District of Kuhbanan County, Kerman Province, Iran. At the 2006 census, its population was 15, in 5 families.

References 

Populated places in Kuhbanan County